Copelatus angustus is a species of diving beetle. It is part of the genus Copelatus in the subfamily Copelatinae of the family Dytiscidae. It was described by Gschwendtner in 1932.

References

angustus
Beetles described in 1932